She Xiang (奢香, 1361-1396), was a Chinese tribute chieftain (tusi) of the Yi people in Guizhou from 1381 until 1396. She succeeded her late spouse An Aucui as tribute chieftain governor of Yi by Imperial approval of the Ming dynasty because her son An Di was to young to do so, and was a such in charge of 41 "Aboriginal bureaus". She was respected for her successful policy of peace between Yi and Han and for her building of roads and bridges.

References 
 Lily Xiao Hong Lee, Sue Wiles: Biographical Dictionary of Chinese Women, Volume II: Tang Through Ming 618 - 1644

1361 births
1396 deaths
14th-century women rulers
14th-century Chinese people
14th-century Chinese women
Yi people